The European Union and Georgia have maintained relations since 1996 in the INOGATE framework, and in 2006 a five-year "Action Plan" of rapprochement was implemented in the context of the European Neighbourhood Policy (ENP). A more comprehensive Association Agreement  entered into force on 1 July 2016, providing Georgia with access to some sectors of the European Single Market, as well as visa-free travel to the EU. Following Brexit, most of the existing EU-Georgia agreements applicable to the United Kingdom were renegotiated and agreed upon in 2019 bilaterally with the United Kingdom.

Both the governing Georgian Dream and opposition United National Movement support Georgia's integration in the EU, and nearly all parties in the Georgian parliament are pro-Western in orientation. A European Union Monitoring Mission has been operating in Georgia since 2009.  In January 2021, Georgia was preparing to formally apply for EU membership in 2024. However, on 3 March 2022, Georgia submitted its membership application ahead of schedule, following the Russian invasion of Ukraine.  In June 2022, the European Commission established Georgia's eligibility to become a member of the EU, but deferred giving it official candidate status until after certain conditions were met. Later that month, the European Council expressed readiness to grant Georgia the status of a candidate after completing a set of reforms recommended by the Commission.

Adjara crisis (2004)

In Adjara, leader Aslan Abashidze was forced to resign in May 2004 following the Rose Revolution. 
EU CFSP Chief Javier Solana indicated in February 2007 that the EU could send troops to Georgia alongside Russian forces.

South Ossetia crisis (2006–08)

In July 2006 the European Union referred to then recent developments in South Ossetia zone of and to the Resolution of the Georgian Parliament on Peacekeeping Forces Stationed in the Conflict Zones, which was adopted on 18 July 2006 as follows:

After the 2008 South Ossetia war an EU cease-fire monitoring mission in Georgia (EUMM) was sent to monitor the Russian troop withdrawal from "security zones" established by Russia around South Ossetia and Abkhazia. The mission started on 1 October 2008 and was prolonged by the EU in July 2009 for one year while the EU expressed concern that Russia was blocking other observers from working there A United Nations Security Council resolution aimed at extending its UN Observer Mission in Georgia was vetoed by Russia on 15 June 2009.

European Neighbourhood Policy Action Plan (2006–11)

On 2 October 2006, a joint statement on the agreed text of the Georgia-European Union Action Plan within the European Neighbourhood Policy (ENP) was issued. The Action Plan was formally approved at the EU-Georgia Cooperation Council session on 14 November 2006 in Brussels.

Association Agreement (2013–present)

To enhance their relationship, the EU and Georgia began negotiating an Association Agreement (AA) and a Deep and Comprehensive Free Trade Agreement. In November 2012, European Commissioner for Neighbourhood and Enlargement Stefan Fule stated that the AA negotiations could be finalized by November 2013. In February 2013, Tamar Beruchachvili, the Deputy State Minister for European and Euro-Atlantic Integration of Georgia, stated that Georgia had no plans to join the Eurasian Economic Union, which Fule has warned Ukraine would be incompatible with the agreements with the EU. A ceremony on the initialling of the AA by the Georgian Foreign Minister Maia Panjikidze and EU High Representative for Foreign Affairs and Security Policy Catherine Ashton was held at the Eastern Partnership summit on 29 November 2013. It was formally signed on 27 June 2014, and had to be ratified by the EU, Euratom, their member states and Georgia. A second agreement, governing the country's involvement in EU crisis management operations, was also signed.

The Association Agreement, much of which provisionally came into force in September, has been fully ratified by Georgia and all EU member states.  On 18 December 2014 the European Parliament approved the Association Agreement. Members backed the treaty by 490 votes in favour to 76 against, with 57 abstentions.  The agreement entered into force on 1 July 2016.

Ratification

Proposed European Union membership 

The European Parliament passed a resolution in 2014 stating that "in accordance with Article 49 of the Treaty on European Union, Georgia, Moldova and Ukraine, as well as any other European country, have a European perspective and can apply for EU membership in compliance with the principles of democracy, respect for fundamental freedoms and human rights, minority rights and ensuring the rule of rights." Membership is welcomed by Georgians, with 77% of the population approving the government's goal to join the EU and only 11% opposing it.

Georgia's former President Mikheil Saakashvili has expressed a desire for Georgia to join the EU. This view has been explicitly expressed on several occasions as links to the United States, EU and NATO have been strengthened in an attempt to move away from the Russian sphere of influence. Territorial integrity issues in Ajaria were dealt with after the Rose Revolution, when leader Aslan Abashidze was forced to resign in May 2004. However, unresolved territorial integrity issues have again risen to the forefront in South Ossetia and Abkhazia as a result of the 2008 South Ossetia War. On 11 November 2010, Georgian Deputy Prime Minister Giorgi Baramidze announced that Georgia wants to cooperate with Ukraine in their attempt to join the European Union.

The European Parliament notes that in accordance with Article 49 of the Treaty with the EU, Georgia, Moldova and Ukraine, like any other European country, have a European perspective and can apply for EU membership in accordance with the principles of democracy - it said in a resolution of the European Parliament in Brussels, adopted at the last session before the elections to the European Parliament, which took place on 23–25 May 2014.

Georgian Prime Minister Irakli Garibashvili said at a press conference in Brussels on 27 June 2014 that Georgia could be a full EU member within 5–10 years. However, he stressed that Georgia had not fixed a date for bidding for EU membership.

The Ministry of Foreign Affairs of Georgia has submitted an action plan for achieve accession to the European Union. The commission received information about the implementation of the Georgia-EU Association Agreement and the National Action Plan for the Implementation of the Association Agenda. As it has pointed out during the meeting, the European side, both in the last year's meeting of the Georgia-EU Association Council and the report of the European Commission, commended the reforms of the Georgian Government aiming at the implementation of the Association Agreement. The meeting also adopted the 2017-2020 Government Strategy on Georgia's EU and NATO Integration Communications.

On 17 January 2021, Irakli Kobakhidze was elected the Chairman of the ruling Georgian Dream party. He announced plans for Georgia to officially apply for EU membership in 2024. Amid the 2022 Russo-Ukrainian War, this was expedited to 3 March 2022. On 7 March, the EU said it will formally assess Georgia's application. On 11 April, Georgia has received EU Membership Questionnaire to fill out and send it back for the review in May. According to Garibashvili, the response to the first part was submitted by May 2, remarking on his Twitter account, "I am sure of Georgia's success on in pursuit of the ultimate goal of the Georgian people", while the second and final part was submitted on 10 May 2022.

On 17 June 2022, the European Commission recommended that Georgia be given the perspective to become a member of the European Union, but deferred recommending it be given candidate status until after certain conditions were met.  On 23 June 2022, the European Parliament adopted a resolution calling for the immediate granting of candidate status for membership of the European Union to Ukraine and Moldova, as well as to support the European perspective for Georgia. On 23 June 2022, the European Council expressed readiness to grant Georgia the status of a candidate for accession to the European Union after a set of recommended reforms.

The EU asked Georgia to complete economic reforms including more investment in education, renewable energy generation, and transportation. Requested political reforms included reduced political polarization, election reforms, judicial reform, stronger anti-corruption institutions, implementing "de-oligarchisation", reducing organized crime, protect journalists from government interference and criminal threats, protect vulnerable groups against criminal human rights violations, improve gender equality, reduce violence against women, increase decision-making influence of civil society, and make the Public Defender more independent.

Visa liberalization dialogue
In June 2012, the EU and Georgia began a visa liberalisation dialogue to allow for visa-free travel of Georgian citizens to the European Union.  The talks aimed to have a Visa Liberalisation Action Plan in place by the end of the year.
The action plan was delivered to Georgia on 25 February 2013.
The new project on 'Strengthening the capacity of the Georgian Government in border management and migration regulation' which was launched in Tbilisi by the EU Delegation to Georgia, will be implemented by the International Organisation for Migration (IOM) and International Centre for Migration Policy Development (ICMPD), the EU Delegation to Georgia said in its statement on 24 January 2014. Thus, Georgia will take another step towards visa-free travel to the Schengen area through an EU-funded project which will help to increase the capacity of the Georgian authorities in the field of integrated border management and migration.  In December 2015, the Commission issued a progress report that found that Georgia met all the conditions for its citizens be granted visa-free travel to the Schengen area.  The European Commission formally proposed Georgia be granted visa free travel in March 2016.  The Committee of Permanent Representatives gave its approval in October 2016, and it was approved by the European Parliament in February 2017. On 8 March 2017 the Official EU Journal published a legislation allowing Georgians owning biometric passports to travel to the Schengen Area visa-free. The legislation came into full effect on 28 March 2017, allowing Georgian citizens to travel for short periods to most EU member countries without a visa.

Georgia's foreign relations with EU member states

See also
 
 Foreign relations of the European Union 
 Foreign relations of Georgia 
 Human rights in Georgia (country)
 Georgia–NATO relations
 Accession of Moldova to the European Union
 Accession of Ukraine to the European Union
 Armenia–European Union relations
 Azerbaijan–European Union relations
 Association Trio
 Moldova–European Union Association Agreement
 Ukraine–European Union Association Agreement
 Potential enlargement of the European Union
 Eastern Partnership
 Euronest Parliamentary Assembly
 EU Strategy for the South Caucasus
 INOGATE

References 

 Fischer, Sabine: "European Policy towards the South Caucasus after the Georgia Crisis" in the Caucasus Analytical Digest No. 1

External links
Georgia, European External Action Service
The European Commission's Delegation to Georgia, European External Action Service
The EU and Georgia: time perspectives in conflict resolution, by Bruno Coppieters, Occasional Paper No. 70, December 2007, European Union Institute for Security Studies

 
Contemplated enlargements of the European Union
European Union
Third-country relations of the European Union